Sentiments Humains is an album by the Canadian singer Pierre Lapointe, released in April 2009. The album reached a peak position of number two on Billboard Top Canadian Albums chart.

Reception
Sentiments Humains reached a peak position of number two on Billboard Top Canadian Albums chart.

Track listing

All tracks written by Lapointe, unless noted otherwise.
 "Ces étranges lueurs" – 1:19
 "Le magnétisme des amants" – 3:06
 "Je reviendrai" – 3:51
 "Au Bar des suicidés" (Philippe Bergeron, Lapointe) – 3:23
 "Tu es à moi" (Bergeron, Lapointe) – 2:49
 "Les lignes de ma main" – 2:41
 "Les sentiments humains" – 4:08
 "Nous restions là" – 3:57
 "Coulent les rires" – 2:51
 "L'enfant de ma mère" – 4:09
 "Comme si c'était hier" – 3:20
 "Les éphérites" – 3:53

Track listing adapted from AllMusic.

Personnel

 Philippe Bergeron – composer
 Sandrine Bisson – choir
 Jacques Boisclari – trombone
 Philippe Brault – clavier
 Amélie Chérubain-Soulière – choir
 Valérie Deault – choir
 Guido Del Fabbro – clavier, soloist
 Josianne Hébert – piano
 Chloé Lacasse – choir
 Pierre Lapointe – composer, vocals
 John Londono – photography
 Jean-Moïse Martin – choir
 Alex McMahon – clavier, Fender Rhodes
 Ryan Morey – mastering
 Jonathan Morier – choir
 François Pagé – assistant
 Bruno Paradis – choir
 Christian Perrault – choir
 Philippe Robert – choir
 Jacques Kuba Seguin – flugelhorn
 Philippe Thibaudeau – choir

Credits adapted from AllMusic.

Charts

Release history

Release history adapted from AllMusic.

References

2009 albums
French-language albums
Pierre Lapointe albums
World music albums by Canadian artists